USS Tripoli may refer to:

  is an  commissioned in 2020

United States Navy ship names